Peter Carey may refer to:

Peter Carey (Australian rules footballer) (born 1954), Australian rules player for Glenelg
Peter Carey (English footballer) (born 1933), English footballer
Peter Carey (historian) (born 1948), British historian of south-east Asia
Peter Carey (novelist) (born 1943), Australian novelist
Peter Carey (umpire), Australian rules umpire
"Black Peter" Carey, a fictional character in The Adventure of Black Peter, a Sherlock Holmes story by Sir Arthur Conan Doyle